HMS Taku was a British T class submarine built by Cammell Laird, Birkenhead. She was laid down on 18 November 1937 and was commissioned on 3 October 1940.

Career
Taku served in home waters and the Mediterranean. In April 1940, she mistook HMS Ashanti for a German destroyer and fired several torpedoes at her. All the torpedoes missed. In an attack on a German convoy in May, she damaged the German torpedo boat , and in November, launched a failed attack on the German tanker Gedania.

Assigned to the Mediterranean in 1941, she scored numerous kills, including the Italian merchantmen Cagliari and Silvio Scaroni, the Italian passenger/cargo ship Caldea, the German munitions transport Tilly L. M. Russ, the Italian auxiliary minesweeper Vincenso P., the Italian tankers Arca and Delfin, and the Greek sailing vessels Niki, Lora and a small vessel which was unidentified. She also attacked, but failed to hit, the German merchant ship Menes and the Italian tanker Cerere.

Reassigned to operate off the Scandinavian coast in 1944, Taku sank the German merchantmen Rheinhausen and Hans Bornhofen, and badly damaged the German freighter Harm Fritzen. In March, she attacked a convoy, but missed her target, the ex-Norwegian Kriegsmarine transport Moshill.

Taku struck a mine in April 1944, and was damaged. After the end of the war, she was sold for scrap in November 1946 and broken up in South Wales.

References

References
 
 
 
 
 
 
 

 

British T-class submarines of the Royal Navy
Ships built on the River Mersey
1939 ships
World War II submarines of the United Kingdom